Athletes from the Socialist Federal Republic of Yugoslavia competed at the 1964 Summer Olympics in Tokyo, Japan.

Medalists

References
Official Olympic Reports
International Olympic Committee results database

Nations at the 1964 Summer Olympics
1964
Summer Olympics